Sergei Valeryevich Shalin (born 14 August 1990) is a Russian former professional football player.

Club career
He made his Russian Football National League debut for FC Torpedo Vladimir on 4 April 2011 in a game against FC Alania Vladikavkaz.

External links
 
 

1990 births
People from Vladimir, Russia
Living people
Russian footballers
Association football defenders
FC Tyumen players
FC Torpedo Vladimir players
Sportspeople from Vladimir Oblast